"Pussyole (Old Skool)" also known as just "Pussyole" and cleanly as just "Old Skool", is the second single taken from British rapper Dizzee Rascal's third studio album Maths + English, and eighth overall. It reached #22 on the UK Singles Chart and topped the UK Indie Singles Chart for a week. The word "pussyole" is a slang term for someone who is weak and unwilling to back up their friends during confrontation.

Wiley
The song is rumoured to be a diss to former friend Wiley of the Roll Deep crew, with whom he had a conflict, which made Dizzee (who was once a member) leave the crew. Wiley responded to the song in a video circulating on YouTube, in which he also takes jabs at rappers Kano and Lethal Bizzle, and then later with the track "Letter 2 Dizzee", from his album Playtime Is Over, to try to end the rift between them.

In the clean version, the chorus is removed, because of the repetition of the phrase "Pussyole".

Samples
The song samples the "Yeah! Woo!" break from Lyn Collins' "Think (About It)". Because of sample clearance issues, the song was removed from the Definitive Jux copies of the album in the US.

Track listing

CD:

 "Pussyole (Old Skool)" (explicit version)
 "Old Skool (Pussyole)" (clean version)
 "My Life" (featuring Newham Generals)
 "My Life" (instrumental)
 "Pussyole (Old Skool)" (instrumental)
 "Pussyole (Old Skool)" (a cappella)

7" Vinyl:

 "Pussyole (Old Skool)" (explicit version)
 "Old Skool (Pussyole)" (clean version)

Charts

References

2007 singles
Dizzee Rascal songs
XL Recordings singles
Songs written by Dizzee Rascal
2007 songs